Brazilians are the citizens of Brazil. A Brazilian can also be a person born abroad to a Brazilian parent or legal guardian as well as a person who acquired Brazilian citizenship. Brazil is a multiethnic society, which means that it is home to people of many ethnic origins, and there is no correlation between one's stock and their Brazilian identity.

Being Brazilian is a civic phenomenon, rather than an ethnic one. As a result, the degree to which Brazilian citizens identify with their ancestral roots varies significantly depending on the individual, the region of the country, and the specific ethnic origins in question. Most often, however, the idea of ethnicity as it is understood in the anglophone world is not popular in the country.

In the period after the colonization of the Brazilian territory by Portugal, during much of the 16th century, the word "Brazilian" was given to the Portuguese merchants of Brazilwood, designating exclusively the name of such profession, since the inhabitants of the land were, in most of them, indigenous or Portuguese born in Portugal or in the territory now called Brazil.

However, long before the independence of Brazil, in 1822, both in Brazil and in Portugal, it was already common to attribute the Brazilian gentile to a person, usually of clear Portuguese descent, resident or whose family resided in the State of Brazil (1530–1815), belonging to the Portuguese Empire. During the lifetime of the United Kingdom of Portugal, Brazil and the Algarves (1815–1822), however, there was confusion about the nomenclature.

Definition

According to the Constitution of Brazil, a Brazilian citizen is:

 Anyone born in Brazil, even if to foreign born parents. However, if the foreign parents were at the service of a foreign State (such as foreign diplomats), the child is not Brazilian;
 Anyone born abroad to a Brazilian father or a Brazilian mother, with registration of birth in a Brazilian Embassy or Consulate. Also, a person born abroad to a Brazilian father or a Brazilian mother who was not registered but who, after turning 18 years old, went to live in Brazil;
 A foreigner living in Brazil who applied for and was accepted as a Brazilian citizen.

According to the Constitution, all people who hold Brazilian citizenship are equal, regardless of race, ethnicity, gender or religion.

A foreigner can apply for Brazilian citizenship after living for four uninterrupted years in Brazil and being able to speak Portuguese language. A native person from an official Portuguese language country (Portugal, Angola, Mozambique, Cape Verde, São Tomé and Príncipe, Guinea Bissau, Equatorial Guinea, and East Timor) can request the Brazilian nationality after only 1 uninterrupted year living in Brazil. A foreign born person who holds Brazilian citizenship has exactly the same rights and duties of the Brazilian citizen by birth, but cannot occupy some special public positions such as the Presidency of the Republic, Vice-presidency of the Republic, Minister (Secretary) of Defense, Presidency (Speaker) of the Senate, Presidency (Speaker) of the House of Representatives, Officer of the Armed Forces and Diplomat.

In 2021, the population in Brazil is 214 million people. The number is updated live by Brazilian Institute of Geography and Statistics (IBGE - Census).

History and overview

Brazilians are mostly descendants of Portuguese settlers, post-colonial immigrant groups, enslaved Africans and Brazil's indigenous peoples. The main historic waves of immigration to Brazil have  occurred from the 1820s well into the 1970s, most of the settlers were Portuguese, Italians, Germans, and Spaniards, with significant minorities of Japanese,  Poles, Ukrainians and Levantine Arabs.

Ancestry of Brazilians

The first inhabitants of what would become Brazil were people whose ancestry can be traced back to Asian populations that crossed the Bering Strait, passing from Siberia to the Americas. There are indications of the presence indigenous peoples in the current Brazilian territory dating from 16,000 BC. in Lagoa Santa (Minas Gerais), from 14,200 BC. in Rio Claro (São Paulo) and from 12,770 BC. in Ibicuí (Rio Grande do Sul). It is difficult to pinpoint the number of Native Americans that were living in present-day Brazil in 1500, with estimates varying between 1 and 5 million. They were divided into two major language families: Macro-Jê and Macro-Tupi. With the arrival of the Portuguese in present-day Brazil, in 1500, a significant part of the indigenous population perished, mainly due to contamination by Eurasian diseases to which the Indians had no biological immunity, such as smallpox, measles, yellow fever or flu. In most cases, these contaminations were involuntary; however, there are also reports of intentional infection. Despite this, millions of Brazilians have indigenous ancestry. In Brazilian history, the practice of "cunhadismo" was very common; it was an ancient indigenous practice of incorporating strangers into their community, through the delivery of indigenous girls as wives. In this context, many Portuguese settlers had relationships with indigenous women, whose descendants make up a large part of the current Brazilian population.

The European ancestry of Brazilians is mainly Portuguese. Between 1500 and 1822, Brazil was a Portuguese colony and the number of Portuguese who emigrated to Brazil, during this period, is estimated at between 500,000 and 700,000. According to IBGE, in the first two centuries of colonization (16th Century – 17th Century), 100,000 Portuguese emigrated to Brazil. However, according to research by historians James Horn and Philip D. Morgan, the number would have been much higher, 250,000. At that time, Brazil was the largest producer of sugar in the world (specifically the northeastern captaincies of Pernambuco and Bahia), and this economic growth attracted many Portuguese immigrants. However, it was in the 18th century that the greatest number of Portuguese arrived in colonial Brazil. According to the IBGE, 600,000 Portuguese emigrated to Brazil, between 1701 and 1760. James Horn and Philip D. Morgan pointed to smaller numbers: 250,000 between 1700 and 1760 and 105,000 between 1760 and 1820.  Celso Furtado estimated, for the entire 18th century, that between 300,000 and 500,000 Portuguese arrived in Brazil. Maria Luiza Marcilio pointed to an intermediate number: 400,000. Considering that Portugal only had 2 million inhabitants in 1700, it was a mass emigration. The reason for this mass emigration lies in the discovery of gold in Minas Gerais, which led to a period of economic prosperity not only in the Minas Gerais region, but also on the Brazilian coast.

As a result of the Atlantic slave trade, from the mid-16th century until 1855, millions of African slaves were brought to Brazil. Based on information from slavevoyages.org, 4,864,375 slaves from Africa landed in Brazil between the 16th century and the mid-19th century, around 40% of all slaves brought to the Americas. The African ancestors of Brazilians were brought mainly from West-Central Africa. Of the total, 3,396,910 were brought from this area. The region used to be known as Congo Angola, roughly corresponding to the territories of present-day Angola, Republic of Congo, Democratic Republic of Congo and Gabon. The second most important region was the Bight of Benin, from which 877,033 Africans came. This region corresponds to present-day southeastern Ghana, Togo, Benin, and southwestern Nigeria.

Slave labor was the driving force behind the growth of the sugar economy in Brazil, and sugar was the colony's main export product, from 1600 to 1650. Gold and diamond deposits were discovered in Brazil from 1690 onwards, which generated an increase in the importation of slaves, to supply labor in mining. The demand for slaves did not suffer from the decline of the mining industry in the second half of the 18th century. Livestock and food production proliferated along with population growth, both heavily dependent on slave labor. The rise of coffee economy after the 1830s further expanded the Atlantic slave trade to Brazil.

When Brazil was a Portuguese colony, the number of Africans who entered Brazil was much greater than that of Europeans. According to Historians James Horn and Philip D. Morgan, between 1500 and 1820, 605,000 Portuguese emigrated to Brazil, against 3.2 million Africans brought, a number 5 times greater. However, this does not mean that over time the population of African origin remained greater than that of Portuguese origin in the same proportion, given the differences in birth rate. In Brazil, the mortality rate was much higher among slaves than among the free; the infant mortality of the children of slaves was very high, due to malnutrition and unhealthy conditions. During most of Brazil's history, the rate of natural increase of the slave population was negative, that is, there were more deaths than births.

Many Brazilians are also descendants of immigrants who arrived in the last two centuries. Brazil received more than 5 million immigrants after its independence from Portugal in 1822, most of whom arrived between 1880 and 1920. Latin Europeans accounted for 80% of arrivals (1.8 million Portuguese, 1.5 million Italians and 700,000 Spaniards). The other 20% came mainly from Germany, Eastern Europe, Japan and the Middle East. In the Brazilian 1920 census, more than 90% of foreigners were concentrated in the states of the Southeast and South regions and more than 70% were in just two regions: São Paulo and Rio de Janeiro. A large part of this immigration was encouraged by the Brazilian government and was linked to the production of coffee. At the end of the 19th century, Brazil was the largest coffee producer in the world and a significant part of the financial health of the Brazilian government depended on coffee exports. After the abolition of slavery in the 1880s and fearing a shortage of workers in coffee cultivation, the state of São Paulo began to subsidize immigration for European workers. The Brazilian government paid for ship's passage for entire immigrant families to work on coffee plantations during a period of about five years, after which they were free to work elsewhere.

Another model of immigration encouraged by the Brazilian government was aimed at agricultural colonization, mainly in the South of the country, where access to small rural properties for European immigrants was facilitated, mainly as a way of filling demographic voids and overcoming the constant threats of food shortages in Brazil.

However, many of these immigrants arrived spontaneously, without any help from the Brazilian government, and were attracted by the increase in urban dynamism, mainly in the Southeast region, largely linked to the surplus of wealth produced by the coffee activity, giving rise to an incipient process of industrialization and expansion of trade and the service sector.

From 1500 to 1972, of all people who entered Brazil, 58% came from Europe, 40% from Africa and 2% from Asia. Most Brazilians have a mixed race ancestry. Genetic studies have shown that Brazilians, whether classified as "brown", "white" or "black", usually have all three ancestries (European, African and indigenous), varying only in degree.

Foreign-born population

From 2011 to 2019, 1,085,673 immigrants came to Brazil, mostly from Venezuela (142,250),  Paraguay (97,316), Bolivia (57,765), Haiti (54,182) and Colombia (32,562).

In 2021, Brazil was home to 1.3 million foreign-born people.

Refugees

In 2021, there were 60,011 people recognized as refugees in Brazil.

Between 2011 and 2020, recognitions of refugee status in Brazil by the National Committee for Refugees (Conare) were mostly to Venezuelans (46,412 recognitions), Syrians (3,594) and Congolese (1,050).

Dispersal of races and colors in the country 

In the Brazilian census, respondents must choose their color or race from 5 categories: Branca, Preta, Amarela, Parda or Indígena, which can be translated to White, Black, Yellow, Brown or Indigenous. The answers are based on self-declaration. According to the census manual, the Yellow category is "For the person of oriental origin: Japanese, Chinese, Korean, etc".

Considering that the Brazilian census is based on the racial self-declaration of the interviewees, the data may present inconsistencies. For example, in the 2010 census, especially in the state of Piauí, many people who had no Oriental origin for some reason classified themselves as "Yellow" in the census. As a consequence, Piauí and other states appeared ahead of the state of São Paulo when it comes to their Yellow proportion, even though it is historically known that most Asian immigrants, mostly Japanese, settled in São Paulo.

Racial classifications in Brazil are fluid. Many Brazilians "change" their race throughout their lives. According to a study, in the analyzed period of nine months, between 2002 and 2014, 22.9% of Brazilians "changed" their race. For example, 19.6% of the people who said they were Brown in a first interview reclassified themselves as White and 8% reclassified themselves as Black in the second interview (only 72% remained Brown). These data come from the Brazilian government.

In the 2010 census, 47.51% of Brazilians classified themselves as White, 43.42% as Brown, 7.52% as Black, 1.10% as Yellow, 0.43% as Indigenous and 0.02% did not answer.

The color or racial composition of Brazilians varies significantly from region to region. For example, in the 2010 census, 83.9% of the population in the southern state of Santa Catarina was classified as White, compared to only 20.9% in the northern state of Roraima. The table below shows the color or racial distribution in the Federative units of Brazil:

Although most Brazilians identify as white, brown or black, genetic studies shows that the overwhelming majority of Brazilians have some degree of a triracial admixture, having European, African and Indigenous ancestry.

São Paulo state has the largest absolute number of Whites, with 30 million Whites, followed by Minas Gerais, Rio Grande do Sul, Rio de Janeiro and Paraná, while Santa Catarina, where 83% of the population was classified as White, reaches the highest percentage.

The cities of São Paulo, Rio de Janeiro, Porto Alegre, Curitiba, Brasília and Belo Horizonte have the largest populations of Ashkenazi Jews.

Most East Asians, especially Japanese Brazilians, the largest group, live in São Paulo and Paraná.

Northern Brazil, largely covered by the Amazon Rainforest, is mostly brown, due to a stronger Amerindian influence.
The two remaining South Eastern states and Central-Western Brazil have a more balanced ratio among racial groups (around 50% White, 43% Pardo, 5% Black, 1% Yellow (East Asian)/Amerindian).

White Brazilians

Brazil has the second largest White population in the Americas, after only the United States, with around 91,051,646 people, and White Brazilians make up the third largest White population in the world, after only the United States and Russia, also counting in total numbers.

Brown people

Brown Brazilians constitute the second largest group of Brazil, with around 84.7 million people.

Black Brazilians

Blacks constitute the third largest ethnic group of Brazil with around 14.5 million citizens or 7.6% of the population.

Yellow Brazilians (East Asians)

In Brazil, the term amarela (yellow) refers to East Asians. The largest group of East Asian ancestry in the country is the Japanese community.

The number of Japanese Brazilians revolves around 2 million descendants and the Japanese community also comprises around 50 thousand Japanese nationals.

Indigenous people

Indigenous people constitute the fifth largest ethnic group of Brazil, with around 800,000 individuals. This is the only category of the Brazilian "racial" classification that is not based on a skin color, but rather on cultural and ethnic belonging.

Genetic studies 

Genetic studies have shown the Brazilian population as a whole to have European, African and Native Americans components.

Autosomal studies
A 2015 autosomal genetic study, which also analyzed data of 25 studies of 38 different Brazilian populations concluded that: European ancestry accounts for 62% of the heritage of the population, followed by the African (21%) and the Native American (17%). The European contribution is highest in Southern Brazil (77%), the African highest in Northeast Brazil (27%) and the Native American is the highest in Northern Brazil (32%).

An autosomal study from 2013, with nearly 1,300 samples from all of the Brazilian regions, found a pred. degree of European ancestry combined with African and Native American contributions, in varying degrees. Following an increasing North to South gradient, European ancestry was the most prevalent in all urban populations (with values up to 74%).

The populations in the North consisted of a significant proportion of Native American ancestry that was about two times higher than the African contribution. Conversely, in the Northeast, Center-West and Southeast, African ancestry was the second most prevalent. At an intrapopulation level, all urban
populations were highly admixed, and most of the variation in ancestry proportions was observed between individuals within each population rather than among population.

An autosomal DNA study (2011), with nearly 1000 samples from every major race group ("whites", "pardos" and "blacks", according to their respective proportions) all over the country found out a major European contribution, followed by a high African contribution and an important Native American component.

"In all regions studied, the European ancestry was predominant, with proportions ranging from 60.6% in the Northeast to 77.7% in the South". The 2011 autosomal study samples came from blood donors (the lowest classes constitute the great majority of blood donors in Brazil), and also public health institutions personnel and health students.

According to an autosomal DNA study from 2010, a new portrayal of each ethnicity contribution to the DNA of Brazilians, obtained with samples from the five regions of the country, has indicated that, on average, European ancestors are responsible for nearly 80% of the genetic heritage of the population.

The variation between the regions is small, with the possible exception of the South, where the European contribution reaches nearly 90%. The results, published by the scientific magazine American Journal of Human Biology by a team of the Catholic University of Brasília, show that, in Brazil, physical indicators such as skin color, color of the eyes and color of the hair have little to do with the genetic ancestry of each person, which has been shown in previous studies (regardless of census classification).

Ancestry informative SNPs can be useful to estimate individual and population biogeographical ancestry. Brazilian population is characterized by a genetic background of three parental populations (European, African, and Brazilian Native Amerindians) with a wide degree and diverse patterns of admixture.

In this work we analyzed the information content of 28 ancestry-informative SNPs into multiplexed panels using three parental population sources (African, Amerindian, and European) to infer the genetic admixture in an urban sample of the five Brazilian geopolitical regions. The SNPs assigned apart the parental populations from each other and thus can be applied for ancestry estimation in a three hybrid admixed population.

Data was used to infer genetic ancestry in Brazilians with an admixture model. Pairwise estimates of F(st) among the five Brazilian geopolitical regions suggested little genetic differentiation only between the South and the remaining regions. Estimates of ancestry results are consistent with the heterogeneous genetic profile of Brazilian population, with a major contribution of European ancestry (0.771) followed by African (0.143) and Amerindian contributions (0.085). The described multiplexed SNP panels can be useful tool for bioanthropological studies but it can be mainly valuable to control for spurious results in genetic association studies in admixed populations".

It is important to note that "the samples came from free of charge paternity test takers, thus as the researchers made it explicit: "the paternity tests were free of charge, the population samples involved people of variable socioeconomic strata, although likely to be leaning slightly towards the pardo group".

An autosomal DNA study from 2009 found a similar profile "all the Brazilian samples (regions) lie more closely to the European group than to the African populations or to the Mestiços".

According to another autosomal DNA study from 2008, by the University of Brasília (UnB), European ancestry dominates in the whole of Brazil (in all regions), accounting for 65.90% of ancestry of the population, followed by the African contribution (24.80%) and the Native American (9.3%). A more recent study, from 2013, found the following composition in São Paulo state: 61.9% European, 25.5% African and 11.6% Native American.

A 2014 autosomal DNA study, which analysed data from 1594 samples from all of the Brazilian regions, found that Brazilians show widespread European ancestry with the highest levels being observed in the south. African ancestry is also widespread (except for the south) and reaches its highest values in the East of the country. Native American ancestry is highest in the north-west (Brazilian Amazon).

MtDna and y DNA studies

Haplogroup frequencies do not determine phenotype nor admixture. They are very general genetic snapshots, primarily useful in examining past population group migratory patterns. Only autosomal DNA testing can reveal admixture structures, since it analyses millions of alleles from both maternal and paternal sides. Contrary to yDNA or mtDNA, which are focused on one single lineage (paternal or maternal) the autosomal DNA studies profile the whole ancestry of a given individual, being more accurate in describing the complex patterns of ancestry in a given place.

According to a genetic study in 2000 who analysed 247 samples (mainly identified as "white" in Brazil) who came from four of the five major geographic regions of the country, the mtDNA pool (maternal lineages) of present-day Brazilians clearly reflects the imprints of the early Portuguese colonization process (involving directional mating), as well as the recent immigrant waves (from Europe) of the last century.

According to a study in 2001, the vast majority of Y chromosomes (male lineages) in white Brazilian males, regardless of their regional source, is of European origin (>90% contribution), with a very low frequency of sub-Saharan African chromosomes and a complete absence of Amerindian contributions. These results configure a picture of strong directional mating in Brazil involving European males, on one side, and European, African and Amerindian females, on the other.

In a study from 2016, the authors investigated a set of 41 Y-SNPs in 1217 unrelated males from the five Brazilian geopolitical regions. A total of 22 haplogroups were detected in the whole Brazilian sample, revealing the three major continental origins of the current population, namely from America, Europe and Africa. The genetic differences observed among regions were, however, consistent with the colonization history of the country.

The Central-Western and Southern samples showed the higher European contributions (95.7% and 93.6%, respectively). The Southeastern region presented significant European (86.1%) and African (12.0%) contributions. Portugal was estimated to be the main source of the male European lineages to Central-West, Southeast and South Brazil.

The North and the Northeast showed the highest contribution from France and Italy, respectively. The highest migration rate from Lebanon was to the Central-West, whereas a significant migration from Germany was observed to the Central East, Southeast and South. The sample from the Northern region presented the highest Native American ancestry (8.4%), whereas the more pronounced African contribution could be observed in the Northeastern population (15.1%).

In the Brazilian "white" and "pardos" the autosomal ancestry (the sum of the ancestors of a given individual) tends to be in most cases predominantly European, with often a non European mtDNA (which points to a non European ancestor somewhere down the maternal line), which is explained by the women marrying newly arrived colonists, during the formation of the Brazilian people.

See also

 Lists of Brazilians
 Brazilian diaspora
 Immigration to Brazil
 Demographics of Brazil
 Pardo (Brown) Brazilians
 European immigration to Brazil
 White Brazilians
 Portuguese Brazilians
 Italian Brazilians
 Spanish Brazilians
 German Brazilians
 Arab Brazilians
 Confederados
 History of the Jews in Brazil
 Native Brazilians
 Afro-Brazilians
 Asian Brazilians
 Japanese Brazilians
 Racial whitening
 Romani people in Brazil
 Brazilian Americans
 Lusitanics
 Brazilians in Japan
 Brazilians in Portugal

Notes

References

Works cited

External links

 Lusotopia

Brazilian people
Ethnic groups in Brazil
South American people by nationality